George Augustus La Dow (March 18, 1826 – May 1, 1875) was a U.S. Representative from Oregon. Elected as a Democrat due to a split among Republicans, La Dow died before Congress assembled.

Early life
Born in Cayuga County, New York, near Syracuse, La Dow moved with his family to McHenry County, Illinois, where he attended public school and studied law. In 1850, he was admitted to the bar and opened a law practice in Waupaca, Wisconsin. From 1860 to 1862, he served as district attorney of Waupaca County.

In 1862, he moved his law practice to Wilton, Minnesota, and served as a member of the Minnesota House of Representatives in 1868 and 1869.

Congressional campaign of 1874
In 1869, La Dow moved to Pendleton, Oregon, serving one term as a member of the Oregon House of Representatives from 1872 to 1874.

In 1874, he was selected as the Democratic nominee for Oregon's seat in the United States House of Representatives. Though little known outside of Umatilla County, due to a split among Oregon Republicans, La Dow faced not only Republican candidate Richard Williams, but also Timothy W. Davenport (father of political cartoonist Homer Davenport), who ran as an Independent. Williams and Davenport debated each other all around the state, split the Republican vote, and handed La Dow a plurality and the election.

However, before Congress convened its session, La Dow died on May 1, 1875. He was interred in Pioneer Park Cemetery in Pendleton.

See also

List of United States Congress members who died in office (1790–1899)

References

External links

1826 births
1875 deaths
People from Cayuga County, New York
Democratic Party members of the United States House of Representatives from Oregon
Democratic Party members of the Oregon House of Representatives
Democratic Party members of the Minnesota House of Representatives
District attorneys in Wisconsin
Politicians from Pendleton, Oregon
People from Waupaca, Wisconsin
Minnesota lawyers
19th-century American politicians
19th-century American lawyers